is a railway station on the Hanawa Line in the city of Hachimantai, Iwate Prefecture, Japan, operated by East Japan Railway Company (JR East).

Lines

Station layout
Ōbuke Station has two ground-level opposed side platforms connected by a level crossing. The station has a Midori-no-madoguchi staffed ticket office.

Platforms

History

Ōbuke Station opened on August 27, 1922, as a station serving the village of Ōbuke. The station was absorbed into the JR East network upon the privatization of JNR on April 1, 1987.

A new station structure was built, opening on 23 February 2018, allowing free access between either side of the station.

Passenger statistics
In fiscal 2015, the station was used by an average of 269 passengers daily (boarding passengers only).

Surrounding area
 
 Ōbuke Post Office
Hachimantai City Hall

See also
 List of railway stations in Japan

References

External links

  

Hanawa Line
Railway stations in Japan opened in 1922
Railway stations in Iwate Prefecture
Stations of East Japan Railway Company
Hachimantai, Iwate